Thomas Houghton Bartley JP (1798 – 25 December 1878) was a New Zealand politician.

Bartley was from Liverpool. Like his brother William, he was a lawyer. In 1838, both of them were in Adelaide. William Bartley stayed in that city and became attorney for the South Australian Company, but Thomas Bartley went to New Zealand in 1839 and settled in the Bay of Islands. In 1841, he moved to Auckland, where he worked as a solicitor.

He represented the City of Auckland electorate on the first and second council of the Auckland Province (20 July 1853 – 15 July 1854; 26 October 1855 – 18 August 1857). He was the first Deputy-Superintendent of Auckland Province (18 September 1856 – 11 November 1856) and the first Speaker of the Province (1853–1857). As Speaker, he was succeeded by William Powditch.

Bartley served in the First New Zealand Parliament, representing the City of Auckland electorate. He was elected on 11 August 1853 and resigned on 11 July 1854.  He was a member of the Fitzgerald Ministry, led by James FitzGerald, from 11 July 1854 to 2 August 1854.

Bartley resigned from the House of Representatives on 11 August 1854 to take up a position in the Legislative Council, where he served as Speaker from 12 May 1856 to 1 July 1868. His membership of the Legislative Council lapsed on 3 July 1874 due to non-attendance.

Bartley was appointed a justice of the peace in 1856. He died on 25 December 1878 at his home in Stokes' Point (these days, the locality is the northern landing of the Auckland Harbour Bridge). He is buried in Parnell, Auckland.

Notes

References

1798 births
1878 deaths
New Zealand MPs for Auckland electorates
Speakers of the New Zealand Legislative Council
Members of the Cabinet of New Zealand
Members of the Auckland Provincial Council
Members of the New Zealand Legislative Council
Members of the New Zealand House of Representatives